The 2011 Generali Ladies Linz was a women's tennis tournament played on indoor hard courts. It was the 25th edition of the Generali Ladies Linz, and part of the WTA International tournaments of the 2011 WTA Tour. It was held at the TipsArena Linz in Linz, Austria, from October 10 through October 16, 2011.

Champions

Singles

 Petra Kvitová defeated  Dominika Cibulková, 6–4, 6–1
 It was Kvitová's fifth title of the year, and the sixth of her career.

Doubles

 Marina Erakovic /  Elena Vesnina defeated  Julia Görges /  Anna-Lena Grönefeld, 7–5, 6–1

Players

Seeds

 Seeds are based on the rankings of October 3, 2011.

Other entrants
The following players received wildcards into the singles main draw:
  Jelena Janković
  Petra Kvitová
  Patricia Mayr-Achleitner

The following players received entry from the qualifying draw:

  Sorana Cîrstea 
  Vitalia Diatchenko
  Stéphanie Foretz Gacon 
  Petra Martić

The following players received entry from a lucky loser spot:
  Anne Keothavong
  Evgeniya Rodina
  Anastasia Rodionova

Withdrawals
The following players withdrew from the tournament:
  Andrea Petkovic (right knee injury)
  Nadia Petrova (left thigh strain)
  Gisela Dulko (lower back injury)

External links
Official website

Generali Ladies Linz
2011
Generali Ladies Linz
Generali Ladies Linz
Generali